A Woman in the Night (French: Une femme dans la nuit) is a 1943 French drama film directed by Edmond T. Gréville and starring Viviane Romance, Georges Flamant and Claude Dauphin.

The film's sets were designed by the art director Jean Douarinou.

Cast
 Viviane Romance as Denise Lorin 
 Georges Flamant as Armand Leroy 
 Claude Dauphin as François Rousseau 
 Henri Guisol as Gustave 
 Marion Malville as Nicole Serin-Ledoux 
 Andrex as Le charbonnier 
 Pierre Stéphen as Campolli 
 Lysiane Rey as Lucie Février 
 Édouard Delmont as Le père Rousseau
 Yves Deniaud as Maxime 
 Jacqueline Hervé as L'ouvreuse 
 Jane Marken as Madame Béghin 
 Robert Moor as Le baron Hochecorne 
 Marcelle Naudia as Madame Serin-Ledoux 
 Gaston Orbal as La Douleur 
 Félix Oudart as Monsieur Serin-Ledoux 
 Gilberte Prévost as La serveuse 
 Jacques Tarride as Un comédien 
 Vanda Gréville
 Jean-François Martial
 Blanchette Delnar

References

Bibliography 
 Philippe Rège. Encyclopedia of French Film Directors, Volume 1. Scarecrow Press, 2009.

External links 
 

1943 films
French drama films
1940s French-language films
Films directed by Edmond T. Gréville
1943 drama films
Films scored by Joseph Kosma
1940s French films